The Torch Keys are three islands in the lower Florida Keys, consisting of Little Torch Key, Middle Torch Key, and Big Torch Key. Little Torch Key is the most populated of the three. The islands were named for their forests of Sea Torchwood (Amyris elemifera), which are effective as kindling even when green.

References

Islands of the Florida Keys
Islands of Monroe County, Florida
Islands of Florida